is a Nikkei enka singer born in Buenos Aires, Argentina. She debuted in 2000 at the age of 18.

External links 
 Oshiro Vanesa Official Homepage
 Vanesa Oshiro at Toshiba EMI

1981 births
Living people
Enka singers
Argentine people of Japanese descent
21st-century Japanese singers
21st-century Japanese women singers
Singers from Buenos Aires